Siege of Valencia may refer to:
 Siege of Valencia (1065), a siege during the reign of Ferdinand I of León and Castile
 Siege of Valência de Alcântara (1664)
 Siege of Valencia (1808)
 Siege of Valencia (1812)